Pagan is the fourth studio album by the Irish Celtic metal band Cruachan released in 2004.

Track listing

"Pagan" also appears on the band's seventh album Blood for the Blood God.

Personnel
Keith Fay - guitars, vocals, keyboards, bouzouki, mandolin, banjo, bodhrán, percussion
Karen Gilligan - vocals, percussion
Joe Farrell - drums, percussion
John Clohessy - bass, vocals (backing)

Additional personnel
Michelle O'Brien - fiddle
Tommy Martin - uillean pipes
Diane O'Keefe - cello
Chris Kavanagh - vocals on "Some Say the Devil Is Dead"
John O'Fathaigh - Irish flute, tin whistle, low whistle, bombard, recorder, keyboards
John Howe - cover art, artwork
Al Cowen - producer, engineering, mixing

Cruachan (band) albums
2004 albums